The Ringelband Foundation has been awarding the Gertrud-Eysoldt-Ring with the city of Bensheim and the German Academy of the Performing Arts since 1986. The award is endowed with €10,000. The jury is annually changing. The prize is awarded for an outstanding performance in the theatre. The theatre critic Wilhelm Ringelband, who died in Bensheim in 1981, donated the prize. Ringelband wanted the name of the Max Reinhardt actress Gertrud Eysoldt (1870–1955) he admired to be associated with an award. The Gertrud-Eysoldt-Ring is one of the most important theatre awards in German-speaking countries.

Recipients
Source:

 1986: Doris Schade
 1987: Gert Voss
 1988: Edith Clever
 1989: Hans Christian Rudolph
 1990: Cornelia Froboess
 1991: Ulrich Mühe
 1992: 
 1993: Jürgen Holtz
 1994: Christa Berndl
 1995: Martin Wuttke
 1996: Corinna Harfouch
 1997: Josef Bierbichler
 1998: Jutta Lampe
 1999: Hans-Michael Rehberg
 2000: Angela Winkler
 2001: Judith Engel
 2002: Michael Maertens
 2003: Dörte Lyssewski
 2004: Ulrich Matthes
 2005: Tobias Moretti
 2006: Nina Hoss
 2007: Ernst Stötzner
 2008: Klaus Maria Brandauer
 2009: Barbara Nüsse
 2010: , Alexander Khuon
 2011: Nicholas Ofczarek
 2012: Constanze Becker
 2013: Steven Scharf
 2014: Samuel Finzi and Wolfram Koch
 2015: Charly Hübner
 2016: Jana Schulz
 2017: Sophie Rois
 2018: André Jung
 2019: Sandra Hüller
 2021:

References

External links
 

Awards established in 1986
1986 establishments in Germany
German theatre awards